Espeland is a village in the borough of Arna in the municipality of Bergen in Vestland county, Norway. Espeland is located north of Lake Haukeland and Mount Livarden.

Starting in 2013, Espeland has been included in the urban area of Arna and separate population statistics are no longer tracked.

Espeland was the site of the Espeland concentration camp built under the direction of German occupation forces between 1942 and 1943.

References

Villages in Vestland
Populated places in Bergen